The Western Rover is a 1927 American silent Western film directed by Albert S. Rogell and written by George Hively. The film stars Art Acord, Ena Gregory, Charles Avery, William Welsh and Albert J. Smith. The film was released on June 5, 1927, by Universal Pictures.

Cast
 Art Acord as Art Hayes
 Ena Gregory as Millie Donlin
 Charles Avery as Hinkey Hall
 William Welsh as Alexander Seaton 
 Albert J. Smith as Bud Barstry
 Raven the Horse as Raven 
 Rex the Dog as Rex

References

External links
 

1927 films
1920s English-language films
1927 Western (genre) films
Universal Pictures films
Films directed by Albert S. Rogell
American black-and-white films
Silent American Western (genre) films
1920s American films